Pennock may refer to:

 Pennock (surname)
 Pennock, Minnesota, United States
 Pennock Island, Alaska